The 2014 GP de Plouay was the 14th running on the GP de Plouay, a women's road race in Plouay, France.

Results

References

GP de Plouay
2014 in French sport
2014 UCI Women's Road World Cup